Standings and results for Group 1 of the UEFA Euro 2004 qualifying tournament.

Group 1 consisted of Cyprus, France, Israel, Malta and Slovenia. Group winners were France, who finished with a 100% record, ten points clear of second-placed Slovenia who in turn qualified for the playoffs.

Standings

Matches

Goalscorers

References
UEFA Page
RSSSF Page

Group 1
2002–03 in Israeli football
2003–04 in Israeli football
2002–03 in Slovenian football
2003–04 in Slovenian football
2002–03 in French football
Qual
2002–03 in Cypriot football
2003–04 in Cypriot football
2002–03 in Maltese football
2003–04 in Maltese football